Charles Lightner (July 17, 1892 – September 1967) was an American Negro league pitcher in the 1920s.

A native of Atkins, Arkansas, Lightner played for the Kansas City Monarchs in 1920. He died in Chicago, Illinois in 1967 at age 75.

References

External links
Baseball statistics and player information from Baseball-Reference Black Baseball Stats and Seamheads 
 Charley Lightner at Arkansas Baseball Encyclopedia

1892 births
1967 deaths
Kansas City Monarchs players
Baseball pitchers
Baseball players from Arkansas
People from Pope County, Arkansas
20th-century African-American sportspeople